Vitaliy Vizaver (born 22 December 1978 in the Kherson Oblast in the Ukrainian SSR of the Soviet Union) is a Ukrainian football defender who last played for FK Andijan in the Uzbek League.

Career
Vizaver graduated from Respublikan Sports School in Kyiv and has played for different clubs in the Ukrainian First League. In 2014, he signed a contract with FK Andijan and completed 4 matches for the club.

References

External links
 

Ukrainian footballers
FC Spartak Ivano-Frankivsk players
FC Tytan Armyansk players
FC Volgar Astrakhan players
FC Krymteplytsia Molodizhne players
FC Kramatorsk players
Ukrainian expatriate footballers
Expatriate footballers in Russia
1978 births
Living people
Ukrainian expatriate sportspeople in Uzbekistan
Association football defenders
Ukrainian First League players
Ukrainian Second League players